Beatrice Bella "BeBe" Shopp (born August 17, 1930), from Hopkins, Minnesota, was Miss America in 1948.

Post-Pageant Career
After winning Miss America 1948, Shopp used her pageant scholarship to attend the Manhattan School of Music. She specialized in the vibraharp, and graduated with a degree in percussion in 1952. She sang with Share the Music and the Cape Ann Symphony Chorus. She was active in community affairs, and headed the board of directors for Gloucester Stage Company.

Near the end of her Miss America reign while traveling in France, Shopp was asked about women wearing two-piece bathing suits to which she replied, 'I don't approve of Bikini suits for American girls...The French girls can wear them if they want to, but I still don't approve of them on American girls.'"

Personal life
Shopp married Korean War navigator Lt. Bayard D. Waring in 1954 and later had four daughters. As of 2000, she lives in Rockport, Massachusetts and is known by her married name Beatrice "Bea" Waring. She was a lay minister in the Episcopal Church and a TV spokeswoman for an electric scooter company. As of October 2022, Shopp is the earliest living former Miss America.

References

External links 
Miss America official website

1930 births
Living people
American Episcopalians
Manhattan School of Music alumni
Miss America 1940s delegates
Miss America Preliminary Swimsuit winners
Miss America winners
People from Hopkins, Minnesota
People from Rockport, Massachusetts
20th-century American people